Stefania percristata is a species of frog in the family Hemiphractidae. It is endemic to Venezuela and only known from its type locality, Cerro Jaua in Bolívar State.
It occurs along streams at the top of the tepui.

Conservation status
The tepui is within the Jaua-Sarisariñama National Park, and no major threats to this species have been identified.

References

percristata
Amphibians of Venezuela
Endemic fauna of Venezuela
Taxonomy articles created by Polbot
Amphibians described in 1997
Amphibians of the Tepuis